Frederik Ludvig Storch (July 21, 1805 – September 2, 1883) was a Danish genre painter.

Biography
Storch was born in Kerteminde on the island of Fyn, Denmark. He was the son of Hannibal Samuel Storch (1775-1817) and Eleonore Christine  Kamp (1772-1849). His father was  a parish priest and vicar.
Storch studied at the Royal Danish Academy of Fine Arts in Copenhagen. In 1828, he made his debut at the Charlottenborg Spring Exhibition. In 1832 he went to the suburb of Schwabing in Munich which was forming a small Danish artist colony.  He associated with fellow artists Niels Simonsen (1807–1885) and Christian Andreas Schleisner (1810-1882). In 1845–46,  he traveled to Italy. 
He stayed at Munich until 1852.  He became a professor at the Royal Academy upon his return to Denmark.

Personal life
In 1830,  he had married his cousin Gertrudmine Claudine Kamp (1811-1881). He died during 1883 and was buried at the Cemetery of Holmen 
(Holmens Kirkegård).

References

Other sources
 

1805 births
1883 deaths
19th-century Danish painters
Danish male painters
Danish genre painters
Academic staff of the Royal Danish Academy of Fine Arts
Royal Danish Academy of Fine Arts alumni
People from Kerteminde
Burials at Holmen Cemetery
19th-century Danish male artists